The men's lightweight (60 kilograms) event at the 2014 Asian Games took place from 24 September to 3 October 2014 at Seonhak Gymnasium, Incheon, South Korea.

Schedule
All times are Korea Standard Time (UTC+09:00)

Results 
Legend
DSQ — Won by disqualification
TKO — Won by technical knockout
WO — Won by walkover

Final

Top half

Bottom half

References

Results

External links
Official website

Boxing at the 2014 Asian Games